Steve Shaw (February 19, 1965 – December 5, 1990) was an American actor best known for playing Eric Fairgate in the television drama series Knots Landing.

Life and career
One of Shaw's earliest acting appearances was on Little House on the Prairie Season 3 Episode 22, Gold Country, as Sam Delano, the son of an Italian couple mining for gold. He made another appearance on Little House on the Prairie in a Season 5 episode entitled "The Odyssey" in which he played a character named Dylan Whittaker who has been diagnosed with terminal leukemia and wishes to see the Pacific Ocean before he dies. He also appeared in two episodes of The Waltons in 1978 as George Simmons. Also in 1978, he played Alexander Armsworth in the Weekly Disney TV movie Child of Glass. Shaw then appeared regularly in Knots Landing from 1979 to 1987, and thereafter made occasional return appearances until 1990.

Death
Shaw died on December 5, 1990, in a head-on traffic collision with a truck in Los Angeles. He was survived by his mother and grandparents; his father had died six months previously of a heart attack.

Filmography

References

External links
 
 

1965 births
American male television actors
American male child actors
Road incident deaths in California
1990 deaths
20th-century American male actors
Burials at Grand View Memorial Park Cemetery
Male actors from St. Louis